The Alaska State Troopers, officially the Division of Alaska State Troopers (AST), is the state police agency of the U.S. state of Alaska. It is a division of the Alaska Department of Public Safety (DPS). The AST is a full-service law enforcement agency which handles both traffic and criminal law enforcement. The AST is also involved in apprehending fugitives as part of the Alaska Fugitive Task Force, an inter-agency collaborative of Alaska police departments that cooperates with police agencies throughout the United States, and less commonly with Interpol in apprehending wanted men and women. Unlike many lower-48 states, the AST also serves as Alaska’s primary environmental law enforcement agency; troopers assigned to the AST’s Division of Alaska Wildlife Troopers are known as “Alaska Wildlife Troopers” and primarily serve as game wardens, although they retain the same powers as other Alaskan state troopers.

Because Alaska has no counties, therefore no county police or sheriffs, in its constitution, the troopers also handle civil papers and mental health custody orders and serve as police through most of rural Alaska. Alaska does have boroughs, which have some similarities but with lesser powers of lower-48 U.S. counties, but only the North Slope Borough Police Department truly functions similarly to a lower-48 county police agency and thus relieves AST of a need to be the primary police agency in this particular region. With jurisdiction across all 663,268 square miles (1,717,856 square kilometers) of Alaska, Alaskan state troopers are the most geographically extended law enforcement officers within the United States, apart from federal officers. They have little, if any local backup. Within the entire State of Alaska, only about 1,300 full-time sworn law enforcement officers patrol a state 1/5th the size of the entire lower-48;  other than troopers and state park rangers (peace officers employed by Alaska’s Division of Parks and Outdoor Recreation), local officers remain in their communities except in extreme emergencies. This includes the only metropolitan police agency in Alaska, the Anchorage Police Department with almost 500 officers. The remaining officers are the over 300 Alaska troopers and smaller municipal agencies which have around 50 in towns like the state capital of Juneau or the second largest town in the state, Fairbanks. The remaining full-time officers serve in small agencies with anywhere from one to ten officers on average. The Alaska State Troopers are assisted in their rural policing duties by Village Public Safety Officers (VPSOs). VPSOs are, as of 2014, fully-sworn and armed peace officers and handle basic law enforcement in extremely remote and/or small Alaskan communities; Alaskan state troopers travel to these communities to assist VPSOs as-needed.

The DPS is headed by a Commissioner appointed by the Governor. This person is a civilian administrator, though historically a career law enforcement officer and administrator. The Commissioner, if a sworn officer upon being appointed as such, may be appointed a "Special Alaska State Trooper" to maintain police powers. The Alaska State Troopers (AST) and Alaska Wildlife Troopers (AWT) are headed by ranking officers with the rank of the Colonel.

History

The Alaska State Troopers trace their heritage back more than a century. Before its founding, law enforcement in Alaska was performed by a succession of federal agencies: the Army, Navy, and Revenue Cutter Service; the Customs Service and the Marshals Service – after a civil government was formed in 1884.

The need for law enforcement became critical in the late 19th century as gold was discovered in Alaska. Gold rush towns had crime rates per capita that dwarfed those of modern U.S. cities. Prostitution, gambling, murder, rape, robbery, arson, kidnapping, aggravated assault, and claim jumping incidents were rampant. Frightened citizens desperately cabled for help. As a result, scores of deputy marshals were deployed to Alaska. Some cities and towns began to charter police departments in the early 20th century.  Deputy marshals continued to be the main force of law in rural Alaska until the advent of the troopers and many early-era officers of the agency were former deputy marshals.

There was no Alaska-wide police force until 1941, when the territorial legislature created the Alaska Highway Patrol. Territorial patrolmen only patrolled the main highways of Alaska, and did not visit remote areas or regions. They were commissioned to only enforce traffic laws. They were eventually deputized as special deputy marshals to fill this void in jurisdiction. The legislature refused to make them police officers until the agency was changed to Territorial Police and additional personnel were hired from among the marshals' ranks. The new agency became the Alaska Territorial Police in 1953, and changed its title to Alaska State Troopers in 1967.

Duties   
The Division of Alaska State Troopers personnel are the general police arm of the agency. They are charged with statewide law enforcement, prevention of crime, pursuit and apprehension of offenders, service of civil and criminal process, prisoner transportation, central communications, and search and rescue. They perform traditional duties most associative with state police in lower-48 states.

The trooper division is divided into five lettered detachments, corresponding to geographic regions of the state, for general policing.  The division also contains two bureaus: Alaska Bureau of Investigation (ABI), Alaska Bureau of Highway Patrol.  The detachments are charged with division responsibilities within their geographic areas.  The bureaus are responsible for the statewide discharge of their specific duties and overall responsibilities. Both detachments and bureaus are responsible for ensuring efforts are made towards meeting the division's core missions as it relates to their respective enforcement programs, public education, training, fiscal planning, and implementation.

The Highway Patrol Bureau functions much like highway patrol agencies of the lower-48 states, with emphasis on major and fatal traffic collisions, speed enforcement, DUI enforcement, and preventative traffic patrol and enforcement, especially on areas like the Parks Highway near Denali National Park. These Troopers receive specialized training in DUI enforcement, traffic collision investigation, reconstruction, and speed enforcement.

ABI provides specialized investigative support to smaller agencies requesting help in cases and it provides detective services to all areas not served by local police. ABI investigators are specially selected and trained investigators who also assist in federal cases and receive specialized investigative and technical instruction throughout their careers.

The State Scientific Crime Detection Lab: The lab, located in Anchorage is fully equipped to provide support and analysis of DNA, blood drug and alcohol blood and breath test screening, fingerprint examination, foot and tire impression analysis, firearm analysis, tool mark analysis, drug exam, fire and explosion trace evidence analysis, UV exam and technology analytical services. The lab serves all of Alaska with certified, highly trained technicians and forensic examiners. AK DPS crime lab personnel are considered among the most proficient examiners in the world to examine. They provide investigative training to police on these techniques.

DPS Academy: The academy in Sitka, located across from the now-closed Sheldon Jackson College is the main police training academy of the state. With the guidelines of the Alaska Police Standards Council (APSC), the academy trains trooper and DPS officers in basic training, in addition to also training local law enforcement officers. DPS trooper personnel remain at the academy for additional "trooper-specific" training once the basic Alaska Law Enforcement Training (ALET) class graduates. The academy is rigorous and paramilitary. The other public academy in the state, located at the former University Park Elementary School on the University of Alaska Fairbanks campus and run by the UAF Community and Technical College, is not affiliated with DPS but is approved for APSC certification.  The Municipality of Anchorage also has an internal ALET academy for its own officers and it occasionally offers in-service classes to other agency personnel. The DPS Academy instructors are given the rank and title of "corporal", the only place in the AST where this rank is used. This assignment can be a stepping stone to promotion and only the most elite of troopers are made training corporals, based on leadership, ability to train, fitness, aptitude, shooting ability and general appearance.

Alaska troopers routinely respond to emergencies alone or with only one other trooper as backup. Additional backup can be hours away, or even days away if weather is severe enough. This requires AST troopers to be independent thinking and self-sufficient. Over 50 troopers, including elements of the SWAT teams from Anchorage and Fairbanks regions and the Juneau Police Department SWAT team all deployed to the southeastern community of Hoonah on August 29, 2010 when two local officers of the Hoonah city police were shot and killed in a rifle ambush shortly before midnight on the 28th. Only the chief of police and one officer remained alive and a local trooper who lived in Hoonah assisted alone for approximately 8 hours. Adverse weather prevented AST small planes and boats from deploying to ferry personnel and equipment, so the US Coast Guard cutter Liberty transported the personnel to Hoonah. The suspect was eventually apprehended two days later when he was tear gassed.

Department of Public Safety rank structure

Rank structure

Sections

Alaska Bureau of Highway Patrol
The Bureau of Highway Patrol (ABHP) is a small division of troopers based out of Seward who focus on the stretch of the Seward Highway near Girdwood. Their primary responsibility is enforcement of the state's impaired driving laws, and traffic enforcement. They also provide assistance in the investigation of fatal and major incapacitating accidents. Troopers in this unit may also respond to standard calls.

Alaska Bureau of Investigations
The Alaska Bureau of Investigations (ABI) is responsible for coordinating and conducting major criminal investigations within Alaska State Troopers jurisdiction to include homicides, sexual assaults, polygraph examinations, fraud, forgery, computer and internet crimes, surveillance, missing persons and lengthier property crimes investigations. ABI headquarters is located in Anchorage with posts in Anchorage, Fairbanks, Juneau, Soldotna, Wasilla. The ABI consists of seven Investigation Units are; Major Crimes, Technical Crimes, Property Crimes, Financial Crimes, Child Abuse Investigations, Cold Case Investigations, and Statewide Drug Enforcement.

Special Emergency Reaction Team
The Alaska State Trooper Special Emergency Reaction Team (ASTSERT) responds to high-risk incidents including hostage situations, warrant executions, and terrorist incidents. SERT is an added, voluntary assignment for specially-qualified Troopers in addition to their other duties. SERT Troopers train regularly and remain on call after hours for emergencies.

ASTSERT Posts:

 Fairbanks
 Palmer
 Soldotna

Statewide Drug Enforcement Unit
The Statewide Drug Enforcement Unit (SDEU) works by providing funding, resources and direct assistance to a number of agencies operating within the state of Alaska. SDEU also investigates criminal cases involving drugs or alcohol. SDEU operates by "aggressively confront[ing] drug and alcohol traffickers."

SDEU's Mission Statement:

 Interdict and seize alcohol and controlled substances that are illegally distributed throughout Alaska
 Identify and arrest distributors of controlled substances and illegal alcohol
 Provide training and investigative support to criminal justice agencies
 Support and participate in public education programs

Search and Rescue
The Alaska State Troopers are required by section 18.60.120 of Alaska law to provide and coordinate search and rescue efforts across the state. The Search and Rescue (SAR) Section is headed by a coordinator who is on 24/7 standby. Upon being called, the SAR section may provide watercraft, aircraft and other equipment to assist in SAR efforts. Part of SAR's responsibilities is to coordinate rescue efforts with other SAR groups such as the US Coast Guard or non-profits such as the Alaska Mountain Rescue Group. Another responsibility of the SAR section is to allocate funding and grants to the various non-profits and regional SAR organizations across the state.

Posts and Locations
The Alaska State Troopers are organized by detachments, each having posts in various cities, towns and villages. The Alaska State Troopers also have various other types of facilities throughout the state, such as the training academy in Sitka. AST also partners with various facilities such as the MATCOM dispatch center in the Mat-Su Valley Borough or the Regional Training Facility ran by the Anchorage Police Department.

Posts
A Detachment North:

 Anchor Point
 Seward
 Soldotna (Headquarters)

A Detachment South:

 Craig
 Ketchikan (Headquarters)
 Juneau

B Detachment:

 Glennallen
 Wasilla
 Palmer (Headquarters)

C Detachment:

 Anchorage (Headquarters) 
 Aniak
 Bethel
 Dillingham
 Emmonak 
 Illiamna
 King Salmon
 Kodiak
 Kotzebue
 McGrath
 Nome
 Saint Mary’s
 Selawik
 Unalakleet

D Detachment:

 Cantwell
 Delta Junction
 Fairbanks
 Galena
 Healy
 Nenana 
 Northway
 Tok

Other Facilities

Dispatch Centers:
 Northern Dispatch Center, Fairbanks
 MATCOM Center (Contracted), Matanuska-Susitna Borough
 Soldotna Public Safety Communications Center (Contracted), Kenai Peninsula Borough

Training Facilities:
 Public Safety Academy, Sitka
 Regional Training Center (Anchorage Police), Anchorage

Mission
The Alaska State Troopers' eight core missions in meeting these responsibilities are:

 Maintain public peace and order;
 Enforce criminal laws and investigate violations of those laws;
 Enforce traffic laws and regulations and investigate violations of those laws and regulations;
 Conduct and manage search and rescue operations;
 Support and assist other law enforcement and governmental agencies;
 Investigate allegations of human abuse or neglect;
 Respond to the concerns and inquiries of citizens;
 Provide current and relevant training to law enforcement and criminal justice agencies.

National security and post-9/11 roles
The Alaska State Troopers trace special duties back to the onset of World War II, when Territorial Highway Patrolmen watched for Japanese invaders and saboteurs by guarding and patrolling Alaska seaports, railroad tracks, airports, military posts and other important facilities. This was especially critical following the invasion of Alaska by the Japanese. Territorial patrolmen also assisted the military by arresting deserters and AWOLS from the armed forces.

After the 9-11 attacks, Alaska State Troopers were recognized by the US government as being in an extremely valuable and unique position and thus a critical asset to national security. Alaska is by distance close to a nuclear-armed nation—North Korea—and even closer to the People's Republic of China. Alaska actually borders Russia and these factors have caused AST to have a historic role in national security. AST and ABI in particular, assist the FBI, US Department of Homeland Security and other federal and military agencies in protecting the US from terrorist activity. ABI assisted the FBI in 2009 in a high-profile preemptive terrorism investigation that resulted in the arrest of a man and woman who were radical Islamist converts and who were planning terrorist attacks from King Salmon, AK. Trooper aircraft historically kept a watchful eye for intrusions into US airspace by Soviet aircraft during the Cold War. As a state entity, AST pilots and aviation assets continue to watch over Alaskan airspace to date in conjunction with the Alaska Wing of the Civil Air Patrol (CAP), in providing protection from threats to national security as it assists the US Coast Guard, US Air Force and US Army air operations as requested.

The Alaska Department of Public Safety Training Academy
The Alaska Department of Public Safety Training Academy, located in Sitka, is run by the Alaska State Troopers. It is tasked with training the officers of every agency in the state of Alaska, with the exception of the Anchorage Police Department and any federal law enforcement agencies operating in Alaska.

Structure
The Public Safety Training Academy is run by the Director who is the rank of Lieutenant and the Deputy Director who is the rank of Sergeant. The Academy also has instructors who are the rank of Corporal. There are also civilian staff members tasked with office work, food preparation, maintenance, and janitorial duties.

Organization
The Public Safety Training Academy operates on a two cycles, one in the spring, and one in the fall. Each class is given an "ALET" designation, meaning Alaska Law Enforcement Training. The Academy is 16 weeks long, and has a two week extension for troopers who are being hired into the Division of Alaska State Troopers or Wildlife Troopers. These two weeks focus on survival training and preparation for many of Alaska's environmental hazards. Classes include lessons on firearms, non-lethal weaponry, emergency vehicle operation courses (EVOC), and general classroom lessons on things such as laws, court cases, and officer safety. Officers must also go through physical training and be physically competent.

Requirements
The Alaska Police Standards Council (APSC) and Alaska Department of Public Safety (ADPS) have certain requirements for peace officers in the state of Alaska:

 Must be 18 to attend the ADPS Academy, 21 to receive an APSC certification
 High School Graduation or GED
 United States Citizenship
 Good Moral Character
 No physical defects that would adversely affect performance
 Valid driver's license
 Never has been convicted of a felony
 Never has been convicted of a misdemeanor of morale turpitude within the preceding 10 years
 Never has been denied an APSC peace officer's certification
 Never has had an APSC peace officer's certification revoked
 Has not used marijuana within the preceding one year
 Has never lied on the APSC application

Expectations
The ADPS Training Academy has the following expectations for recruits:

 Ability to read and comprehend Federal and State laws
 Ability to use senses, and demonstrate sound reasoning and judgment
 Act and think quickly in emergency situations
 Ability to communicate effectively, both orally and in writing
 Operate a motor vehicle with a valid drivers license
 Differentiate colors
 General computer literacy
 General mathematics
 Leadership abilities

Village Public Safety Officer Program

The Alaska State Troopers also manage the Village Public Safety Officer program, which provides a peace officer presence in remote communities, usually Native villages that have no police departments and are too small for a trooper post. VPSOs are state trained peace officers, and as of July 2014 are fully credentialed Alaska police officers. They carried no firearms from the start of the program in the mid-1970s until the Alaska legislature authorized arming the officers and making them fully empowered peace officers as of July 2014. This legal change was in response to the violent assaults, shootings and even two murders of VPSOs in the line-of-duty on differing occasions. The DPS Academy is tasked to train and certify VPSOs with firearms. In addition, VPSOs also carry all other typical tools of a peace officer, such as Kevlar bullet resistant body armor, TASER electronic control weapon, pepper spray, and baton. The VPSO 9-week basic training course at the DPS Academy mirrors several aspects of the ALET program except that VPSOs do not receive basic emergency vehicle operation course (EVOC). If a VPSO should later opt to join a police department after completion of VPSO training, they would not be required to attend the full DPS Law Enforcement Training Program.

VPSOs are employed by local Native Corporations and supervised by designated area Troopers. VPSOs carry out only basic police tasks such as emergency call response, juvenile offense investigations, protective custody holds of inebriates, assistance to social workers and medical providers, crime scene preservation, issuance of citations for misdemeanor and non-criminal violation offenses, misdemeanor arrests and detention of felony suspects for surrender to troopers, wildlife protection through the Division of Fish and Wildlife Enforcement, engage in search and rescue of missing persons and perform services usually performed by county sheriff's departments in other states, such as prisoner transport. VPSOs usually also receive Alaska Firefighter-I training and either Alaska Emergency Medical Technician-I (EMT-I) or Alaska Emergency Trauma Technician (ETT) in addition to the basic training.

The Village Public Safety Officer Program began in the late 1970s as a means of providing rural Alaskan communities with needed public safety services at the local level. The program was created to reduce the loss of life due to fires, drowning, lost person, and the lack of immediate emergency medical assistance in rural communities.  The Village Public Safety Officer Program was designed to train and employ individuals residing in the village as first responders to public safety emergencies such as search and rescue, fire protection, emergency medical assistance, crime prevention and basic law enforcement. Recent pay raises, statutory changes for firearms armed VPSOs and other areas of expanded training have improved the retention and recruitment of VPSOs.

Fallen officers
There have been 16 Alaska State Troopers, 1 Court Services Officer, and 2 K9s killed since its beginning in 1948.

Equipment

Firearms
Smith and Wesson M&P model 10 .308 Current issue to AWT

Vehicles

The Alaska State Troopers operate the following vehicles:
 Chevy Express Van  
 Chevrolet Impala  
 Chevy pickup truck  
 Dodge Charger  
 Ford Crown Victoria Police Interceptor  
 Ford Police Interceptor Sedan  
 Ford Police Interceptor Utility  
 Ford Expedition  
 Ford F-250  
 Ford F-150  
 Lenco BearCat  – 3

Aircraft
 Beechcraft Super King Air  
 Cessna 185  
 Cessna 208  
 Eurocopter AS350  
 Piper PA-18   – used for fisheries patrol
 Robinson R44

Previous Issued Sidearms
 Smith & Wesson Model 4006 .40 S&W- replaced by the Glock Model 22 .40 S&W
 Smith & Wesson Model 686 .357 magnum- replaced by the Smith & Wesson Model 4006
 Smith & Wesson Model 66 .357 magnum- replaced by the Smith & Wesson Model 686
 Smith & Wesson Model 19 .357 magnum- replaced by the Smith & Wesson Model 66

Museum

The Alaska Law Enforcement Museum is a small museum located at 245 W. 5th Avenue, Suite 113 across from the 5th Avenue Mall in downtown Anchorage, operated by the Fraternal Order of Alaska State Troopers. The museum commemorates the Alaska State Troopers and features a variety of historical memorabilia, including a restored 1952 Hudson Hornet patrol car.

In popular culture
Clint Walker starred as the title character in Kodiak, a short-lived TV series that ran on ABC in 1974.  Walker played "Kodiak" McKay, an officer in what was called, in this series, the "Alaska State Patrol."

The National Geographic hit television reality series Alaska State Troopers accompanies troopers throughout the state as they perform their various duties. The show depicts firsthand, the short-handed troopers in their harsh and dangerous duties of the AST. Two troopers who regularly appeared on the show, Sergeant Patrick "Scott" Johnson and Trooper Gabriel Rich were both shot and murdered in the line of duty, while investigating a weapons complaint in the small rural Arctic town of Tanana (Yukon River) in 2014.  The show has been very positively received worldwide and is credited with a peak in interest by people wanting to serve as an Alaska Trooper or other peace officer in Alaska.

Alaska State Troopers appear prominently and regularly on other TV reality shows such as Ice Road Truckers, Tougher in Alaska and Deadliest Catch. They were also featured occasionally on the show Northern Exposure as the Alaska State Police.

Alaska State Troopers were highly visible during the 2008 Presidential campaign, providing security detail supplemental personnel to the US Secret Service while protecting former Alaska Governor and Republican Vice presidential candidate Sarah Palin.

See also

 Alaska State Troopers (TV series)
 Alaska Public Safety Commissioner dismissal
 Highway Patrol
 Jean Frances Howard, who was AST's first female sworn officer and was inducted into the Alaska Women's Hall of Fame by virtue of that accomplishment of being a State Trooper
 List of law enforcement agencies in Alaska
 State Patrol
 State Police (United States)

References

External links
 Division of Alaska State Troopers at Alaska Department of Public Safety official site
 Village Public Safety Officer Program
 Fraternal Order of Alaska State Troopers
 Alaska State Troopers Museum at ExploreNorth (with photographs)

1967 establishments in Alaska
Government agencies established in 1967
Troopers